The cricoarytenoid ligament extends from the lamina of the cricoid cartilage to the medial surface of the base and muscular process of the arytenoid cartilage.

Human head and neck
Ligaments